Frans Rens (Geraardsbergen, 2 February 1805 – Ghent, 19 December 1874) was a Flemish writer.

From 1823 up to 1843, he was an inspector of gold and silver work at Ghent, and head of lower education for the school area Lokeren.

Bibliography
 Boudewijn de IJzeren (1837)
 Gedichten (1839)
 Bladeren uit den vreemde (1855)

See also
 Flemish literature

Sources
 G.J. van Bork en P.J. Verkruijsse, De Nederlandse en Vlaamse auteurs (1985)
 Frans Rens
 Frans Rens biography

1805 births
1874 deaths
Writers from Ghent
Flemish activists
Flemish writers
People from Geraardsbergen